Álvaro de Barros Lins GCC • GCL (December 14, 1912 – June 4, 1970) was a Brazilian lawyer, journalist, professor and literary critic.

Family 
Married to Heloísa Ramos Lins, with whom he had two children.

Career

Journalism 
The son of Pedro Alexandrino Lins and Francisca de Barros Lins, Álvaro Lins took the primary course in his hometown, moving to attend high school at Salesian College and Padre Félix Gymnasium, both in Recife. There he entered the Faculty of Law of the University of Recife in 1931, bachelor's degree in 1935. At the age of 20, as a representative of the Student Directory, he produced his first cultural work, called The university as a School of Public Men. From 1932 to 1940, he was also a professor of general geography and history of civilization in several schools in the city.

In October 1934, invited by the then intervenor and later governor of Pernambuco, Carlos de Lima Cavalcanti, assumed the position of Secretary of the State Government. He was part, in 1936, of the plate of the Social Democratic Party (PSD) of Pernambuco, to run for a seat in the House of Representatives. However, the coup that established the Estado Novo interrupted the elections and Álvaro Lins left the Secretariat of state in November 1937 and forgot his political plans.

From there, he became a journalism writer, performing it in the Diário da Manhã of Pernambuco, from 1937 to 1940, where he was editor and director. Moving to Rio de Janeiro, he began to make literary criticism, a genre that gave him national fame. There, he was a journalist for diário de notícias, Diários Associados, between 1939 and 1940, and editor-in-chief of Correio da Manhã, from 1940 to 1956. In 1952 he left for Portugal to teach the discipline Brazilian Studies at the Faculty of Philosophy and Letters of the University of Lisbon. There is also collaboration of his authorship in the Luso-Brazilian magazine Atlântico.

Returning to Brazil in August 1954, because of the crisis triggered by the suicide of Getúlio Vargas, he resumed journalism and the chair of Brazilian Literature at Colégio Pedro II.

Literary work at the Academia Brasileira de Letras 
On April 5, 1955, at the age of 42, he was unanimously elected to become the fourth occupant of chair 17 of the Brazilian Academy of Letters, vacant after the death of Edgar Roquette-Pinto, being received by the academic João Neves da Fontoura on July 7, 1956.

Other jobs 
Álvaro Lins was the president of the 1st Inter-American Conference of Amnesty for Exiles and Political Prisoners of Spain and Portugal, based at the São Paulo Law School in 1960, and director of the Literary Supplement of the Daily News between March 1961 and June 1964. In 1962, he headed the Brazilian delegation to the World Peace Congress, held in Moscow. Retiring from the newspaper in 1964, Álvaro Lins devoted his last years to writing books. On 30 December 1957 he was awarded the Grand Cross of the Military Order of Christ of Portugal and on 28 December 1994 he was awarded a posthumous title with the Grand Cross of the Order of Liberty of Portugal.

Books 
In Portuguese.

 A universidade como escola de homens públicos, 1933
 História literária de Eça de Queiroz, 1939
 Alguns aspectos da decadência do Império, 1939
 Jornal de crítica: primeira série, 1941
 Poesia e personalidade de Antero de Quental, 1942
 Jornal de crítica: segunda série, 1943
 Notas de um diário de crítica - Primeiro volume, 1943
 Palestra sobre José Veríssimo, 1943
 Jornal de crítica: terceira série, 1944
 Rio Branco, 1945
 Jornal de crítica: quarta série, 1946
 No mundo do romance policial, 1947
 Jornal de crítica: quinta série, 1947
 Jornal de crítica: sexta série, 1951
 A técnica do romance em Marcel Proust, 1951
 Roteiro literário do Brasil e de Portugal: antologia da língua portuguesa, 1956
 Discurso sobre Camões e Portugal, 1956
 Discurso de posse na Academia, 1956
 Missão em Portugal: diário de uma experiência diplomática - I, 1960
 A glória de César e o punhal de Brutus, 1962
 Os mortos de sobrecasaca, 1963
 O relógio e o quadrante, 1963
 Girassol em vermelho e azul, 1963
 Dionísios nos trópicos, 1963
 Jornal de crítica: sétima série, 1963
 Jornal de crítica: oitava série, 1963
 Notas de um diário de crítica - Segundo volume, 1963
 Literatura e vida literária, 1963
 Sagas literárias e teatro moderno no Brasil, 1967
 Filosofia, história e crítica na literatura brasileira, 1967
 Poesia moderna no Brasil, 1967
 O romance brasileiro, 1967
 Teoria literária, 1967

Awards 

 Centenário de Antero de Quental Award, for the essay Poesia e personalidade de Antero de Quental, 1942
 Felipe de Oliveira Award, from the Sociedade Felipe de Oliveira, 1945, for the book Rio Branco, 1945
 Pandiá Calógeras Award, from the Associação Brasileira de Escritores, for the book Rio Branco, 1945
 Grã-Cruz da Ordem Nacional do Mérito, 1956
 Grã-Cruz da Ordem de Cristo, Portugal, 1957
 Jabuti Personality of the Year Award, from the Câmara Brasileira do Livro, for the book Missão em Portugal, 1960
 Luiza Cláudio de Souza Award, for the books Os mortos de sobrecasaca and Jornal de crítica Sétima série, 1963

References 

Brazilian literary critics
20th-century Brazilian lawyers
Brazilian journalists
1912 births
1970 deaths
Brazilian academics